Sabulodes is a genus of moths in the family Geometridae first described by Achille Guenée in 1857.

Species
 Sabulodes adumbrata (Warren, 1895)
 Sabulodes aegrotata (Guenée, [1858])
 Sabulodes amyntoridaria (Oberthür, 1923)
 Sabulodes argyra Druce, 1891
 Sabulodes arses Druce, 1891
 Sabulodes atropesaria (Walker, 1860)
 Sabulodes boarmidaria Oberthür, 1883
 Sabulodes boliviaria Oberthür, 1911
 Sabulodes caberata Guenée, [1858]
 Sabulodes caberata Rindge, 1978
 Sabulodes carbina (Druce, 1892)
 Sabulodes chiqua (Schaus, 1901)
 Sabulodes cleodora (Dognin, 1908)
 Sabulodes cletiusaria (Schaus, 1933)
 Sabulodes convergens (Bastelberger, 1911)
 Sabulodes curta Rindge, 1978
 Sabulodes depile Rindge, 1978
 Sabulodes dissimilis (Hulst, 1898)
 Sabulodes duoangulata (Cassino & Swett, 1923)
 Sabulodes edwardsata (Hulst, 1886)
 Sabulodes exhonorata Guenée, [1858]
 Sabulodes franciscata Dognin, 1892
 Sabulodes huachuca Rindge, 1978
 Sabulodes lachaumei Herbulot, 1988
 Sabulodes laticlavia Rindge, 1978
 Sabulodes loba Rindge, 1978
 Sabulodes mabelata (Sperry, 1948)
 Sabulodes mastaura Druce, 1891
 Sabulodes matrica Druce, 1891
 Sabulodes matrona Druce, 1891
 Sabulodes meduana Druce, 1891
 Sabulodes mima Thierry-Mieg, 1894
 Sabulodes mucronis Rindge, 1978
 Sabulodes niveostriata (Cockerell, 1893)
 Sabulodes nubifera (Warren, 1904)
 Sabulodes olifata (Guedet, 1939)
 Sabulodes ornatissima Thierry-Mieg, 1892
 Sabulodes plauta Rindge, 1978
 Sabulodes prolata Rindge, 1978
 Sabulodes puebla Rindge, 1978
 Sabulodes pumilla Rindge, 1978
 Sabulodes sericeata Barnes & McDunnough, 1917
 Sabulodes setosa Rindge, 1978
 Sabulodes solola Rindge, 1978
 Sabulodes spoliata (Grossbeck, 1908)
 Sabulodes striata Rindge, 1978
 Sabulodes subalbata (Dognin, 1914)
 Sabulodes subcaliginosa (Dognin, 1911)
 Sabulodes subopalaria (Walker, 1860)
 Sabulodes sulphuraria (Maassen, 1890)
 Sabulodes thermidora (Thierry-Mieg, 1894)
 Sabulodes triangula Rindge, 1978
 Sabulodes versiplaga (Dognin, 1911)
 Sabulodes wygodzinskyi Rindge, 1978
 ? Sabulodes acidaliata Guenée, [1858]
 ? Sabulodes arge Druce, 1891
 ? Sabulodes arnissa Druce, 1891
 ? Sabulodes bilineata Warren, 1897
 ? Sabulodes colombiata Guenée, [1858]
 ? Sabulodes dentinata Guenée, [1858]
 ? Sabulodes exsecrata Schaus, 1911
 ? Sabulodes gorgophonaria Oberthür, 1911
 ? Sabulodes gorgyraria Oberthür, 1911
 ? Sabulodes gortyniaria Oberthür, 1911
 ? Sabulodes himerata Guenée, [1858]
 ? Sabulodes mimula Thierry-Mieg, 1894
 ? Sabulodes muscistrigata Guenée, [1858]
 ? Sabulodes nubifera Schaus, 1911
 ? Sabulodes polydora Thierry-Mieg, 1892
 ? Sabulodes pumilis Dognin, 1900
 ? Sabulodes rotundata Dognin, 1918
 ? Sabulodes tinonaria Dognin, 1896

References

Ourapterygini